Sanna Mirella Marin (born 16 November 1985) is a Finnish politician who has been serving as prime minister of Finland since 2019. A member of the Social Democratic Party of Finland (SDP), she has been a member of Parliament since 2015. 

Marin was born in Helsinki but later moved to Tampere where she graduated from the University of Tampere. She joined the Social Democratic Youth in 2006, later serving as its vice-president from 2010 to 2012. She served as a member of the City Council of Tempere and was later elected member of Parliament. Following Antti Rinne's resignation in the wake of the postal strike controversy, Marin was selected as prime minister on 8 December 2019. Taking office at the age of 34, she is the youngest person to hold the office in Finnish history, as well as the world's fourth-youngest state leader after Dritan Abazović of Montenegro, Gabriel Boric of Chile and Ibrahim Traoré of Burkina Faso.

As prime minister, Marin led the response to the COVID-19 pandemic by invoking a state of emergency. She condemned the human rights abuses of Uyghurs in Xinjiang and the 2022 Russian invasion of Ukraine. Together with president Sauli Niinistö, she announced that Finland would apply for NATO membership in May 2022. Throughout her time in office, she has been also faced with criticism, particularly due to a October 2020 photoshoot and leaked private party videos. She has been featured on BBC's 100 Women list, as a cover of Time magazine's "Time100 Next" issue that showcased influential international leaders, and was dubbed by the Australian Broadcasting Corporation as "the icon of progressive leadership".

Early life and education 
Sanna Mirella Marin was born on 16 November 1985 in Helsinki. She also lived in Espoo and Pirkkala before moving to Tampere. Her parents separated when she was very young; the family faced financial problems and Marin's father, Lauri Marin, struggled with alcoholism. After her biological parents separated, Marin was brought up by her mother and her mother's female partner.

Marin graduated from the Pirkkala High School (Pirkkalan Yhteislukio) in 2004 at the age of 19. She worked in a bakery and as a cashier while studying (2007–2017), graduating with a bachelor's (2012) and master's (2017) degrees in Administrative Science from the University of Tampere.

Early political career
Marin's political career was described by the BBC as "beginning at the age of 20", in the years following her high school graduation and beginning her affiliation with the Social Democratic Youth. Marin joined the Social Democratic Youth in 2006 and served as its first vice-president from 2010 to 2012. 

In 2008, she unsuccessfully ran for election to the City Council of Tampere, but stood again and was elected in the 2012 elections. She became chairwoman of the City Council within months, serving from 2013 to 2017. In 2017, she was re-elected to the City Council. She first gained prominence after video clips of her chairing contentious meetings were shared on YouTube.

Marin was elected second deputy chairman of the SDP in 2014. In 2015, she was elected to the Finnish Parliament as an MP from the electoral district of Pirkanmaa. Four years later, she was re-elected. On 6 June 2019, she became Minister of Transport and Communications. On 23 August 2020, Marin was elected chair of the SDP, succeeding Antti Rinne.

Prime Minister of Finland (2019–present) 

In December 2019, Marin was nominated by the SDP to succeed Antti Rinne as the Prime Minister of Finland, but Rinne formally remained party leader until June 2020. In a narrow vote, Marin prevailed over Antti Lindtman. A majority of the ministers in her five-party cabinet are women, numbering 12 out of 19 at the time of the cabinet's formation. She is the third and longest-serving female head of government in Finland, after Anneli Jäätteenmäki and Mari Kiviniemi.

Upon her confirmation by Parliament at the age of 34, she became Finland's youngest-ever Prime Minister, and was the youngest serving state leader until Sebastian Kurz regained that description in January 2020.

During the global COVID-19 pandemic in 2020, the Marin Cabinet invoked a state of emergency in Finland to alleviate the epidemic. When Swedish Prime Minister Stefan Löfven could not attend a European Council meeting in October 2020 because of his mother's funeral, Marin stepped in to represent Sweden. In return, Marin asked Löfven to represent Finland at a Council meeting later that month.

Foreign policy 

In March 2021, Marin condemned the persecution of ethnic Uyghurs in the Chinese province of Xinjiang. She emphasised that "trade or the economy is not a reason to ignore these atrocities".

During her year address at the beginning of 2022, in response to Russian aggression at the Russo-Ukrainian border, Marin stated that Finland had the right to join NATO if it wanted to, and should consider this option. This statement was responded to by some Russian media outlets with the phrase: "Moscow was stabbed in the back". 

On 24 February 2022, Russian president Vladimir Putin ordered the invasion of Ukraine. On 25 February, a Russian Foreign Ministry spokesperson threatened Finland and Sweden with "military and political consequences" if they attempted to join NATO, which neither were then actively seeking. Both countries had attended an emergency NATO summit as members of NATO's Partnership for Peace and both had condemned the invasion and had provided assistance to Ukraine.

In February, following the 2022 Russian invasion of Ukraine, Marin commented on Finland's potential membership, observing: "It is also now clear that the debate on NATO membership in Finland will change", while noting that a Finnish application to NATO would require widespread political and public support.

In March 2022, she said the EU needed to end its dependency on Russian oil, adding that "we have these very tough economic sanctions on the one hand, and on the other hand we are financing the Russian war by buying oil, natural gas and other fossil fuels from Russia."

On 4 March 2022, President of Finland Sauli Niinistö visited Washington, D.C. to meet with President Joe Biden and a number of other U.S. politicians and security personnel. In a press conference with Finnish media, Niinistö said that in the meeting the presidents discussed the Russian invasion of Ukraine and its impact on European and Finnish security. Furthermore they agreed on deepening Finnish-US security co-operation and bilateral relations. On 12 May 2022, ten weeks after the beginning of the invasion, President Niinistö and Prime Minister Marin in a joint statement said that "Finland must apply for NATO membership without delay" as such membership "would strengthen Finland's security".

On 15 May, Niinistö and Marin announced that Finland would apply for NATO membership, and on 17 May the Finnish parliament approved the proposal in a vote of 188–8. Marin said she was surprised by Turkey's opposition to Finland's NATO membership. She said her country did not want permanent NATO bases or nuclear weapons on its territory. On 26 May 2022, Marin went to Kyiv at the invitation of Ukrainian Prime Minister Denys Shmyhal, where she met President Volodymyr Zelenskyy and visited the war-torn cities of Irpin and Bucha. On 26 May 2022, Marin also signed a bilateral framework agreement on the rebuilding of Ukraine's education with Ukrainian Prime Minister Denys Shmyhal. On 31 May, she welcomed a deal agreed by all EU leaders to ban more than 90% of Russian oil imports by the end of the year, voting for it in the European Council.

In late November and early December 2022, Marin visited New Zealand and Australia, becoming the first Finnish prime minister to visit the two countries. She met with New Zealand Prime Minister Jacinda Ardern and Australian Prime Minister Anthony Albanese, and covered several issues including bilateral trade relations, the global economic situation, the Russian invasion of Ukraine and climate change mitigation.

On 10 March, Marin said Finland could discuss transferring F/A-18 Hornets to Ukraine, subject to international cooperation, training requirements and Finland's own security situation. Finnish President Sauli Niinistö denied any discussions over the issue. The Finnish Defence Minister Antti Kaikkonen said that the Hornets would be required for the foreseeable future. Marin re-iterated her call for a fighter aircraft discussion as "the next big question" after main battle tanks, stating that Ukraine's defense against Russia requires heavier weaponry. She emphasized that Finland has no position on the issue yet.

Trendi photoshoot 
In October 2020, an interview of Marin in the Finnish lifestyle magazine Trendi about her job and its expectations was illustrated by a photograph in which she wore a blazer with nothing underneath it and trousers. It generated much public controversy, with critics accusing her of tastelessness and demeaning her office, and others defending her and accusing the critics of sexism.

Spending 
On 25 May 2021, Finnish media reported that Marin and her family were spending about €300 per month on groceries with public funds as a part of the Prime Minister's tax-free housing benefits in the official residence, Kesäranta. The legality of the customary arrangement that had been in place for decades was questioned since the rules on the residential benefits did not explicitly mention food provisions. Later, the amount spent was found to be €850 per month, not the €300 first thought. Marin and her family had used around €14,363.20 on catering services in the form of breakfast provisions and cold evening meals in the Prime Minister's official residence between January 2020 and May 2021, equivalent to €845 per month. She stated that she did not know the limit. It turned out that civil servants in the Prime Minister's Office (VNK) handled the payments and Marin was not informed of the running costs of the residential perk. Marin's family have resided in the Kesäranta residence unusually much for a Prime Minister due to the restrictions and practicalities during the pandemic. With the controversy over spending on groceries, Marin had to dispel speculation that public money had also been spent on her wedding, saying that she and her husband "paid for all our wedding expenses ourselves". The Office of the Chancellor of Justice cleared Marin of illegalities in its verdict in December 2022, and stated that she had the right to trust the civil servants whom the Office rebuked for unlawful actions.

Actions during the COVID-19 pandemic 
In early December 2021, Marin visited a night club in Helsinki with some friends; earlier that day she had been in contact with Finland's foreign minister, who subsequently tested positive for COVID-19, thus exposing the Prime Minister to the infection. Marin was informed of this and advised by an Undersecretary of State that she did not need to self-isolate, as she was fully vaccinated. Later that night two text messages were sent to Marin's governmental work phone alerting her that she should self-isolate after all. However, Marin didn't receive the messages because she was only carrying her parliamentary work phone; the governmental work phone has different security restrictions for its usage. Apparently there was a failure to check whether she had received the update, and therefore no messages to her parliamentary phone. The phone camera video of Marin in the night club published by the magazine that broke the story, 7 Päivää, shows Marin on the dance floor checking her smartwatch for messages.

According to Marin, she had been told that going out in public was permitted due to her having been fully vaccinated. The next day she received information that this was not the case, so she explained missing the updated advice and apologised for her poor judgement on Facebook. Two complaints about Marin's behaviour were filed to the Chancellor of Justice, who subsequently exonerated her. Prominent members of the Centre Party, a partner in Marin's five-party coalition government, alleged that Marin had lied to them by altering her explanations of the events; however, they did not provide evidence of where this occurred.

Private party videos 
In August 2022, leaked videos of Marin partying and dancing in a private apartment in Helsinki became public, and went viral. In response to what Marin called "serious allegations in the public domain" regarding drug use, she voluntarily took a drug test on 19 August "for [her] own legal protection [and] to clear up any doubts" and tested negative. There was further controversy after an image of Marin's friends from a party in the prime minister's official residence were leaked depicting two topless women kissing with a "Finland" sign covering their breasts. Marin apologised for the image and called it "not appropriate".

Sámi rights legislation 
In October 2022, Sanna Marin apologised to the indigenous Sámi people for the delays in the reform of the Sámi human rights legislation. The legislation has been in the making for three parliamentary terms without success. In Marin's cabinet, the law has been repeatedly blocked by the Centre Party. Marin stated that she would bring the legislation for a parliamentary vote even without Centre Party support. In November, ministers voted 11–3 to send the legislation to the Finnish Parliament. On 24 February 2023, the constitutional law committee voted 9–7 to suspend work on the bill, preventing the legislation from being passed before the 2023 Finnish parliamentary election. In the committee vote, the Centre Party voted with the conservative opposition to block the Sámi Parliament Act. In an interview on Ykkösaamu, Marin expressed her disappointment in the bill's failure.

Personal life 
On 28 January 2018, Marin and her partner Markus Räikkönen had their first child, daughter named Emma Amalia. In August 2020, Marin and Räikkönen, who works in communications, married at the Prime Minister's official residence, Kesäranta. Their permanent residence is in the Kaleva district of Tampere, but during the COVID-19 pandemic, they have resided at Kesäranta. She has said that, if she had the choice, she would move to the countryside.

Marin describes herself as coming from a "rainbow family", as she was raised by two female parents. She was the first person in her family to attend university. Marin is a vegetarian.

Awards 
Marin was on the list of the BBC's 100 Women announced on 23 November 2020. On 9 December 2020, she was selected by Forbes to rank 85th on the list of The World's 100 Most Powerful Women. In 2020 she became a Young Global Leader of the World Economic Forum. Marin was selected for the cover of Time magazine's "Time100 Next" theme issue, which showcases one hundred influential leaders from around the world. In the December 2022 Financial Times selected Marin on the 25 most influential women list.

Also, the French magazine Marie Claire ranked Marin as one of the most influential women in its "1st Annual Power List". The German newspaper Bild has praised Marin as the "coolest politician in the world". In 2022, The Australian Broadcasting Corporation named Marin as the icon of progressive leadership.

National Orders 
: Grand Cross of the Order of the White Rose of Finland

References

Further reading

External links

 
 

|-

1985 births
Living people
Politicians from Helsinki
People from Espoo
People from Pirkkala
Politicians from Tampere
Prime Ministers of Finland
Finnish environmentalists
Finnish feminists
Finnish city councillors
Members of the Parliament of Finland (2015–19)
Members of the Parliament of Finland (2019–23)
Ministers of Transport and Public Works of Finland
Leaders of the Social Democratic Party of Finland
Women government ministers of Finland
Women prime ministers
BBC 100 Women
Ecofeminists
World Economic Forum Young Global Leaders
University of Tampere alumni
20th-century Finnish women
21st-century Finnish women politicians
Women Prime Ministers of Finland